Cambridge Business School s.r.o. is an educational institution providing professional management education in the BBA, MBA and LLM programmes. It was founded in 2010 and its headquarters are in Prague 1, Czech Republic.

Accreditation and memberships 
The school programmes are accredited by Ministry of the Interior of the Czech Republic and the school is a member of educational and economic associations:
International Education Society (IES)
European Association for Distance Learning
Accreditation Council for Business Schools and Programs
International Association for Distance Learning
European Association for International Education
European Association for Business Studies
British Chamber of Commerce
Czech Chamber of Commerce
Principles for Responsible Management Education

References

External links 

 Official website

Educational institutions in Prague
Business schools in the Czech Republic
2010 establishments in the Czech Republic
Educational institutions established in 2010
Prague 1